The Imagined Savior Is Far Easier to Paint is the third studio album by American jazz trumpeter Ambrose Akinmusire. The album was released on March 10, 2014 by Blue Note, Capitol, and Universal labels.

Background
This is his second album for Blue Note. Akinmusire wrote 12 of the 13 tracks and produced the album. Composition "Rollcall for Those Absent" is similar to "My Name is Oscar" from his 2011 album When the Heart Emerges Glistening as it adds social context to music, this time through reading the names of young people killed from gunfire, including Patrick Dorismond and Trayvon Martin). "Ceaseless Inexhaustible Child (cyntoia brown)" explores a theme of a woman serving a life sentence for a murder that she committed as a teenager. "Our Basement (ed)" suggests the interior monologue of a homeless man.

Reception
Will Layman of PopMatters stated: "The virtues of The Imagined Savior Is Far Easier to Paint are, finally, so varied and many that some readers of this review may wonder if it sounds disjointed. And the answer is no. Even though Akinmusire cycles his music through four different vocal performances, several different combinations of instruments, mixing genres with abandon along the way, the result is unified in the best sense. Akinmusire's voice on trumpet is a clear through-line that brings one very interesting voice to every song. The variations in tone, form, and emotion make Imagined Savior a satisfying journey rather than an immersion in a single mood, such that listening to this album as it was conceived and put together by a great artist is a whole, marvelous experience. Ambrose Akinmusire, with his two most recent recordings, stakes a claim as one of the very best musicians in jazz – or any other style of music. He won't be contained. Neither will your emotions as you soak up this daring, fulfilling, perfectly crafted 80 minutes of music."

Thom Jurek of Allmusic wrote: "Akinmusire self-produced this set and showcases a diverse range of carefully scripted, genre-blurring compositions—modern classical, vanguard pop, spoken word—in addition to jazz... The Imagined Savior Is Far Easier to Paint is provocative: its moodiness, myriad musical directions, and 79-minute length may be initially off-putting. What is revealed with repeated listening, however, is that this set's achievement is commensurate with its ambition."

Track listing

Personnel 
 Ambrose Akinmusire – trumpet, songwriter, producer
 Walter Smith III – saxophone
 Sam Harris – piano
 Charles Altura – guitar
 Harish Raghavan – bass
 Justin Brown – drums
 OSSO String Quartet – strings
 Becca Stevens – vocals, songwriter, lyricist (track 3)
 Theo Bleckmann – vocals, lyricist (track 7)
 Cold Specks – vocals, lyricist (track 9)

References

2014 albums
Ambrose Akinmusire albums
Blue Note Records albums